Miquelon Airport  is a regional airport on  Miquelon Island that the commune (municipality) of Miquelon-Langlade, in the French overseas community (collectivité d'outre-mer) of Saint Pierre and Miquelon, off the eastern coast of North America in the Gulf of St. Lawrence.

Overview
The main building contains the check-in counters, control tower and fire fighting station.

Airline and destination 

There are no direct flights from mainland France. Connecting flights (with Air Canada, Air France, Air Transat or Corsair International) to mainland France required a transfer via Saint-Pierre en route to Montréal–Trudeau airport, or to catch a seasonal flight once weekly from Saint-Pierre to Paris.

The airport's runways are capable of handling turboprop or small jet aircraft only.

Statistics

Gallery

See also
Saint-Pierre Airport
Transport in Saint Pierre and Miquelon
List of airports in Saint Pierre and Miquelon

References

External links 

 Le Service de l'Aviation Civile de Saint-Pierre et Miquelon 
 Travel Resources for Saint-Pierre & Miquelon

Airports in Saint Pierre and Miquelon
Miquelon-Langlade